Oak Grove is an unincorporated community in St. Francois Township in Madison County, Missouri, United States. It is located on Route 72, approximately six miles west of Fredericktown.

It received its name from its location in a grove of oak trees.

References 

Unincorporated communities in Madison County, Missouri
Unincorporated communities in Missouri